Delia Cugat (born 1935) is an Argentinian artist who has lived and worked in Paris for most of her professional career, with her partner Sergio Camoreale, also a well-known Argentinian artist). Cugat is one of the founding members of the graphic art group Grabas. Cugat's work encompasses the solitary everyday world of Edward Hopper, the pictorial reflection of Balthus, and the Cubist idea of composition of Jacques Villon. She has her own world of meanings and has established herself as belonging to that of the Latin American greats.

Early life, education, and career 
Cugat was born in Argentina in 1935. Since the end of the 1950s, Cugat has been pursuing a means of self-expression. She began when she was very young, studying at the School of Fine Arts in Buenos Aires. In 1958, she entered the world of the theater, where she made sets, design costumes, and ventured into directing plays and ballets. A trip to Europe a few years later led her to continue her studies at the School of Fine Arts. While there, she apprenticed under and learned a great deal from renowned Argentine artist, Horatio Butler. Later, for two years, she worked in the Studios of the Museum of Modern Art in Rio de Janeiro. In the 1970s she returned to Buenos Aires and with three other artists, Pablo Obelar, Daniel Zelaya and Sergio Camporeale, founded the Grabas Group. As a graphic arts group, the Grabas group had full access to a printmaking workshop in Buenos Aires, which allowed them to explore a broad range of printmaking media, including etching, lithography, and silkscreen. The Grabas group was active in printmaking presentations at universities and workshops throughout South America, with a particular focus on Argentina, Colombia, and Venezuela.  Eventually, the group moved to Paris to seek fame and fortune.

As a member of the Grabas Group, which revolutionized the concept of graphic work, Cugat is considered one of the pioneering artists of Latin America. In her painting, from 1990, Turbulences Argentinean School, Delia Expresses the turbulence felt while studying at art school. Here she has painted, using quick painterly brush strokes, a swirling dreamscape with an image of a girl dressed in her night gown, in the act of running through her dream, but somehow unable to escape from the wheel.  The essence of her art lies in the structure of composition with its patient brushstrokes, which seek out a sensitive world of modeled tones and structured masses.  The action appears invented, fictitious, created merely to give an existence to the image, in a kind of sentimental projection on a specially structured landscape. It is on the basis of this fictitious fabric, the confluence of surfaces, directions, and characters that Cugat manages to liberate the plastic elements of her art.

Work 
Cugat's body of work has transitioned significantly from her early years in Argentina till now. Very early on, she used mixed graphic media as a way to express her memories or the feelings associated with them. Her work at this time was structured with very few elements as not to distract from the overall message. A good example of this, stylistic simplicity, is her piece entitled Las Moradas from 1973.

In the early 1980s, after moving to Paris France, Cugat began to work primarily in oil. The works created around this period were muted in tone, mostly shades of tan and gray, and depicted quiet reflective scenes. One such work, Desde el Mirador, from 1980, depicts a man in the background, back to the viewer, looking out, as the title suggests, at a sort of picturesque viewing area. The scene is dominated by architectural features that separate the viewer from the figure.  The painting has a sense of melancholy that will come to define Cugat's work in years to come.

In the late 1980s and early 1990s, her work began to incorporate bold and vibrant color schemes. She would continue to utilize vibrant color for the rest of her career. In addition, she began to fracture her paintings in a cubistic fashion and began to make use of looser brushwork. A good example of these new found techniques is a work from 1991 entitled L'adiau. In this piece Cugat depicts a memory of travel and combines it with a feeling of separation. Two figures dominate this scene, they seem to be say goodbye to one another but are far removed from each other, effectively highlighting both the sadness of separation and the feeling of ambiguity.

Acclaim

Personal influence 
The following is a direct quote from Cugat concerning her personal perspective and the relative influences in and on her work:

Selected exhibitions

Solo 
 1995 Habitante Gallery, Panama, Panama
 1994 The Americas Collection, Coral Gables, Florida, U.S.A.
 1993 Habitante Gallery, Panama, Panama
 1992 Cultural Salon of Avianca, Bogota, Colombia
 1991 Francony Gallery, Paris, France
 1988 Arte Autopista Gallery, Medellin, Colombia
 1986 Ruta Correa Gallery, Freiburg, Germany
 1985 Dana Ravel Gallery, Austin, Texas, U.S.A
 1984 Mary Ann Martin Fine Art, New York, New York, U.S.A
 Del Reino Gallery, Buenos Aires, Argentina
 1983 Galería Garcés Velásquez, Bogota, Colombia
 1981 Gisele Linder Gallery, Basel, Switzerland
 1979 Giannini Gallery, La coruña, Spain
 Gallery Kandinsky, Madrid, Spain
 1977 Krief-Raymond, Paris, France
 Gian Ferrari, Milan, Italy

Group 
 1995 Espacio Gallery, San Salvador, El Salvador
 1994 4th Art Biennial, Cuenca, Ecuador
 1991 Francony Gallery, Chicago, Illinois
 1990 Francony Gallery, Paris, France
 1988 Ruta Corre Gallery, Freiburg, Germany
 1985 Kornfeld Gallery, Berna, Switzerland
 Del Estoril Art Gallery, Lisboa, Portugal
 Galerie Artcurial, Paris, France

Museum exhibitions and collections 
 Nacional Museum, Bogota, Colombia
 La Tertulia Museum, Cali, Colombia
 Monterrey Museum, Monterrey, Mexico; Art Museum of the Americas, Washington D.C.
 National Museum of Fine Arts, Buenos Aires, Argentina
 Contemporary Art Museum, Pereira, Colombia
 Contemporary Art Museum, Caracas, Venezuela
 Collection Barbara Duncan, University of Texas, Austin, U.S.A.

References

External links 
 https://www.annexgalleries.com/artists/biography/483/Cugat/Delia

1935 births
Living people
Argentine artists
Argentine contemporary artists